Osru Diye Lekha is a 1972 Bangladeshi film directed by Kamal Ahmed. It was released on 12 May 1972. The film received critical acclaim, particularly for the acting of Sujata and the songs performed by Sabina Yasmin, her "Osru Diye Lekha"s .

Cast
 Abdur Razzak
 Sujata
 Suchanda

Music
All music were composed by Ali Hossain with background score by Subal Das. Songs were written by Mohammad Moniruzzaman.

Track List

References

External links

1972 films
Bengali-language Bangladeshi films
Films scored by Ali Hossain
1970s Bengali-language films
Films directed by Kamal Ahmed (director)